Praeacrospila is a genus of moths of the family Crambidae described by Hans Georg Amsel in 1956.

Species
Praeacrospila melanoproctis Hampson, 1899
Praeacrospila patricialis (Schaus, 1912)
Praeacrospila pellucidalis (Dognin, 1904)
Praeacrospila xiphialis (Walker, 1859)

References

Spilomelinae
Taxa named by Hans Georg Amsel
Crambidae genera